Oxytelus bengalensis is a species of rove beetle widely spread in Asia. It is found in China, Hong Kong, South Korea, Japan, Vietnam, Laos, Myanmar, Thailand, Malaysia, Singapore, Bangladesh, Sri Lanka, Nepal, Pakistan and India.

Description
Male is about 5.0 mm and female is 4.7 mm in length. Body is brown to dark testaceous. Head pitchy, where the pronotum is brown with dark posterior and lateral margins. Abdomen brownish. Clypeus trapezoidal and not protruding. Supra-antennal ridges are slightly elevated upward. Mandible is stout, and slightly curved. There are two denticles on inner edge of mandible. Elytra punctate and rugose. Abdomen coriaceous and pubescent. Female is smaller than male and spermatheca is slim and 3-bent.

The species can be misidentified as O. nigriceps and O. ruptus. But, the species can be differentiated by coriaceous vertex, with fine punctures. In male, the sternite VIII possess with median plate bi-emarginate forming three teeth on apical margin.

References 

Staphylinidae
Insects of Sri Lanka
Insects of India
Beetles described in 1840